Albert Gigaire (1872-1959) was a police officer, a businessman and a local politician in Shawinigan, Quebec.  He was the eighth Mayor of Shawinigan from 1930 to 1936.

He was born in 1872 in Saint-Barnabé, Mauricie.

Gigaire served as a council member from 1918 to 1920.

He ran for mayor in Shawinigan in 1930 and won.  Gigaire was re-elected in 1932 and 1934.

Under his administration, which took place during the Great Depression, the following facilities were dedicated:

 The city Water Works Building (the structure still stands at 1843, boulevard des Hêtres);
 Parc Saint-Maurice (the downtown public playground had been completed ten years earlier);
 Sainte-Thérèse Hospital (located at 1705, avenue Georges).

Gigaire did not run in 1936.

He died in 1959.

Rue Gigaire (Gigaire Street) in the Christ-Roi neighbourhood was named to honour him.

Notes and references

1872 births
1959 deaths
Mayors of Shawinigan